South Toledo Bend is a census-designated place (CDP) in Newton County, Texas, United States. The population was 434 at the 2020 census, down from 524 at the 2010 census.

Geography
South Toledo Bend is located at  (31.156779, -93.607466).
The CDP lost area prior to the 2010 census.

Demographics

As of the 2020 United States census, there were 434 people, 187 households, and 159 families residing in the CDP.

As of the census of 2000, there were 576 people, 289 households, and 199 families residing in the CDP. The population density was 31.2 people per square mile (12.1/km2). There were 723 housing units at an average density of 39.2/sq mi (15.1/km2). The racial makeup of the CDP was 96.70% White, 2.26% African American, 0.35% Native American, 0.17% Asian, and 0.52% from two or more races. Hispanic or Latino of any race were 0.69% of the population.

There were 289 households, out of which 10.0% had children under the age of 18 living with them, 64.0% were married couples living together, 2.1% had a female householder with no husband present, and 30.8% were non-families. 27.7% of all households were made up of individuals, and 14.2% had someone living alone who was 65 years of age or older. The average household size was 1.99 and the average family size was 2.37.

In the CDP, the population was spread out, with 10.2% under the age of 18, 3.1% from 18 to 24, 15.1% from 25 to 44, 37.2% from 45 to 64, and 34.4% who were 65 years of age or older. The median age was 58 years. For every 100 females, there were 100.0 males. For every 100 females age 18 and over, there were 102.7 males.

The median income for a household in the CDP was $37,697, and the median income for a family was $42,212. Males had a median income of $33,646 versus $14,375 for females. The per capita income for the CDP was $20,238. About 4.1% of families and 9.4% of the population were below the poverty line, including 8.1% of those under age 18 and 7.0% of those age 65 or over.

References

External links
 Toledo Bend tourism site
 Partnership of Southeast Texas -- regional economic development site

Census-designated places in Newton County, Texas
Census-designated places in Texas